Nils Skog (16 December 1877 – 28 April 1964) was a Swedish sports shooter. He competed in the 300m free rifle, three positions event at the 1912 Summer Olympics.

References

External links
 

1877 births
1964 deaths
Swedish male sport shooters
Olympic shooters of Sweden
Shooters at the 1912 Summer Olympics
Sportspeople from Gävleborg County